Backyard cricket, Bat ball, street cricket, beach cricket, corridor cricket, garden cricket, box cricket (if the ground is short) referred to as gully cricket in the Indian subcontinent, is an informal ad hoc variant of the game of cricket, played by people of all genders and all ages in gardens, back yards, on the street, in parks, carparks, beaches and any area not specifically intended for the purpose.

Backyard cricket has connotations to the pastimes of Australian, South African and New Zealander children who had large expansive backyards where they were able to play this informal game of sport often with friends, family and neighbors. In the South Asian region, gully cricket is very popular.

Overview 

Though loosely based upon the game of cricket, many aspects are improvised: the playing ground, the rules, the teams, and the equipment. Quite often there are no teams at all; the players take turns at batting and there is often no emphasis on actually scoring runs. 

Equipment and field:
The bat can be anything, as long as it can hit the ball and can be suitably held in the hands. However, usage of a bat is necessary. 
A ball is the other essential item. 
Tennis balls are often used due to the fact that they are less likely to inflict injuries than a cricket ball. They are also much cheaper and more readily available than a leather cricket ball and are easier to hit due to their slower air-speed and relative lightness. Tennis balls also bounce more than normal cricket balls, especially at low speeds.  
Sometimes a tennis ball will be heavily taped on one side to give the ball extra 'swing'. This is known as a 'swing ball'—swing balls may be made with: gaffer tape, electrical tape, plumbing tape or any other kind of tape available. A completely taped tennis ball is very popular for street cricket in Pakistan as the electric tape makes the ball heavier and less bouncy as compared to a normal tennis ball but it is still relatively harmless as compared to a real cricket ball. 
The pitch can be any stretch of ground that is reasonably flat. 
The wicket may be any convenient object – a chair, a cardboard box, a set of long twigs or sticks, a rubbish bin, tree or a drawing on the wall.  Often, the wicket is by no means close to the official size, but it is used anyway. 
A wicket at the non-striker's end is generally a single stump if proper stumps are available and in the absence of larger objects may be just a hat or a shoe.  Its main purpose is to mark the bowler's crease, but can be instrumental when there are two batters and one may be run out. 

Games with relatively few players typically forgo the teams and innings format of professional cricket, opting instead for a batters-vs-everyone format.

Garden/backyard cricket in South Africa and Australia is considered by many to be the pinnacle event of social and sporting excellence in the summer period. Many games are paired with a barbecue which often has a carnival atmosphere. It is historically very popular on Australia Day.

Several closely related variants of cricket exist in South America, known as bete-ombro, taco, bets, or plaquita.

Rules 

As a generally informal contest, the rules are flexible but usually agreed upon by the players prior to playing it. Below are listed some of the most common rules.

Backyard cricket allows for rules to be changed, and the rules being played by will depend on the context and physical environment of the game. However a list of the typical rules which are used most of the time are as follows: 
No Ducks – A batter cannot be given out without scoring – They may always try again until they score at least one run. 
First/Trial ball rule: (A stricter alternative to No Ducks) A batter cannot be given out on the first ball they face (known as Trial Ball in the subcontinent). This and the No Golden Ducks rule are commonly applied to those with little cricketing skill.
 Equipment and field
Wicket material – If stumps are unavailable or unsuitable, any other material object may be used, with garbage bins being common, and some people also use stickers or paint lines on to restrict the "stump area" of the object to a more realistic size.
Pitch – The pitch should be between 11 and 33 yards (10 to 30 meters), with limiting factors such as backyard size often dictating the length.
Ways of getting out
One Hand, One Bounce – If the batter has hit the ball into the ground, but it has only bounced once, they can still be given out caught, but only if the fielder catches the ball with one hand; even if the hand hits the ground (keeping in mind dust on the palm) the player is out.
One Hand, One Bounce, One Beer – An alternate to the one hand, one bounce rule where the fielder must also be in possession of a beverage (traditionally a beer) in order to enact the rule and get the batter out. However, spilling a significant proportion of the beverage may be deemed enough to nullify the catch.
No LBW – As many backyard cricket games are without umpires, or self-umpired, or played with juniors, teams may agree to not use the relatively difficult LBW rule. 
Another alternative is "Auto-LBW", by which the batter is always deemed to be out in almost any possible LBW scenario; it also has the effects of discouraging purely defensive batting, and typically increases the rotation of batsmen.
 Three hits on the body can get the batter out in gully cricket, wicket (sport) and bete-ombro.
Six and Out – If you hit it over the fence you're out and you have to get the ball. The 6 runs are awarded to the batter to reflect the great shot that they have hit. This rule is especially popular in small backyards (where the rule may be applied to any ball that lands over the fence – not just 6's), and encourages the batter to exercise control and restraint by aiming for 4's instead of 6's.  In street cricket, the rule applies if the ball goes into  neighbor's front garden/yard. Six-and-out is also often extended to include nearby fragile objects such as windows and cars which are declared out-of-bounds; if a ball hits an out-of-bounds object on the full it is deemed six-and-out, even if no damage is evident.
Auto Wickie — (also known as Electric Wickie/Keeper) If playing in front of a garage door or similar, the structure takes on the role of wicket keeper. Any balls making contact with the Auto Wickie without bouncing, or "on the full", is considered out. Catches (i.e. from snicks) also apply.
Retire at X –  All batsmen must retire (end their turn) once they reach a certain pre-declared number of runs (such as 20, 50 or 100). This prevents anyone "hogging the bat", and helps ensure everyone gets a chance to bat.
Lost Ball – If a lost ball cannot be found, and if there is no replacement ball, the match ends effective immediately. If losing the ball was the result of hitting a six-and-out the batter is declared the loser. Other scenarios may result in the match deemed a No Contest, or the highest-scoring batter declared the winner.

Running to score runs
Hit and Run — (also known as Tip and Run) Like in baseball, if the batter bat makes contact with the ball they must run. 
No running between wickets – Players may agree that batsmen don't run between the wickets, a rule often applied on hot summer days. As a result, batsmen typically cannot be run out, but can still be stumped if found out of their crease. In order to score they must hit 4's (or 6's if allowed).
Rules for fielders:
Dogs – Dogs are considered fielders, and they effectively switch teams with each innings to constantly remain on the fielding team. If a dog catches the ball (the one-bounce rule is also often allowed), or if the dog (or any other pet) is hit by the ball on-the-full, the batter is declared out. It is the responsibility of the fielding team to chase dogs when required, but ultimately it is the responsibility of the bowler to clean the ball of any slobber.

Extra Player – If both teams have an even number of players and there is one extra person, he is considered a joker player ("Kacha limbu.") The joker is part of both teams. The joker is required to field in both innings, but he is not allowed to bowl. However, he is allowed to bat on both side of the team. He is allowed to bat in any order. Depending on the agreement of both captains, he can be restricted to bat last. 
Toss – The coin toss plays an important role in backyard cricket like it does in international play. The captain that wins the toss may choose to bat first, or choose the first player. The cricket bat itself is often used in place of a coin, where the call is in respect to whether the bat tossed in the air lands with its flat side upwards or downwards.

If the game is not played individually, the person who owns the bat and ball may choose to bat first.

Beach cricket 

Play on an actual beach can be achieved either by using the flat strip of hard-packed sand along the surf line as the pitch, or by only "bowling" gentle full tosses to avoid the problem of the ball not bouncing off loose sand.
If there are no true stumps available a bin, deckchair, boogie board or cool box may be used. Tennis balls are often used in place of cricket balls as they float in the water and don't get bogged in the sand as easily.

In beach cricket the creases and the boundary are normally drawn in the sand in a line which extends well past the side of the agreed pitch to prevent them becoming obliterated in the first over. The batsmen will frequently redraw the line.  Sometimes, play is shifted along the beach to a new pitch as the packed sand of the original pitch is turned up, thus reducing the standard of or even completely disabling bowling. The tide plays a big part in the standard of the pitch in beach cricket.  During low tide, the pitch tends to be on the semi-wet sand, and is deemed superior than cricket played in high tide (when the pitch is on dryer, looser sand).  In particularly long matches, the play will shift up and down the beach depending on the tide.

South American variants 

In Brazil, the game of bete-ombro, also known as taco or bets, is played with two teams of two players. It is generally played using plastic bottles as wickets, and the fielding team's players alternate between wicket-keeping and bowling, based on which player has the ball. The batters must cross their bats together while running, and a batter can be stumped or run out if they don't ground their bat within their "crease" (which is a circle on the ground in front of the stumps). 

In the Dominican Republican, the game of "la plaquita" is similar.

In Suriname, "bat-en-bal" is likely derived from cricket. Only one end of the pitch has a set of stumps.

See also
 French cricket
 Catch  
 Flying disc sports
 Lawn game
 Stickball
 Wiffleball

Explanatory notes

References

External links

Cricket on board HMS Gibraltar circa 1900

Further reading
 
  
 Backyard cricket serious business for some with pitches popping up across Melbourne each summer | Herald Sun 
  
 
  
  
  
 Get active: Backyard cricket | Herald Sun
  
 Chris Lynn believes backyard cricket helped him earn call-up to Australia's T20 side | The Courier-Mail
 Roger Caillois' Man, Play and Games (University of Illinois Press, 2001, .)

Team sports
Ball games
Short form cricket
cricket
Sports originating in Australia